The 1972 Rhode Island gubernatorial election was held on November 7, 1972. Democratic nominee Philip Noel defeated Republican nominee Herbert F. DeSimone with 52.55% of the vote.

General election

Candidates
Major party candidates
Philip Noel, Democratic
Herbert F. DeSimone, Republican 

Other candidates
Adam J. Varone, Independent

Results

References

1972
Rhode Island
Gubernatorial